Homan Potterton (9 May 1946 – 8 December 2020) was an art historian and writer who was director of the National Gallery of Ireland, 1980-88. At 33, he was the youngest ever director of the gallery. He was previously (1974–80) an assistant keeper, curator, at the National Gallery, London. He was editor of Irish Arts Review, 1993-2002. He wrote several art books and catalogues: Andrew O'Connor, Sculptor (1974); Irish Church Monuments, 1570-1880 (1975); A Guide to the National Gallery (1976); The National Gallery, London (1976); Reynolds & Gainsborough: Themes & Painters in the National Gallery (1976); Pageant and Panorama: the Elegant World of Canaletto (1978); (jointly) Irish Art and Architecture (1978);Venetian Seventeenth Century Painting (1979); Dutch 17th and 18th Century Paintings in the National Gallery of Ireland: a Complete Catalogue (1986).

His memoir of growing up in Ireland in the 1950s is Rathcormick: a Childhood Recalled (2001). A second, Who Do I Think I Am? A Memoir (2017), brings the story up to his retirement at the age of 42. The title derives from a poem, The National Gallery Restaurant by Paul Durcan the last line of which is "Who does Homan Potterton think he is-Homan Potterton?" His novel, Knockfane, was published in 2019.

In his time in the National Gallery of Ireland he oversaw the production of the first ever catalogues of the Gallery's collections. He was also responsible for persuading Sir Alfred and Lady Beit to leave seventeen paintings, the cream of the Beit Collection, to the Gallery.

He was an honorary member of the Royal Hibernian Academy.

References and sources
Notes

Sources
 Who's Who (A & C Black, London); Peter Somerville Large, 1854-2004: the Story of the National Gallery of Ireland (2004), pp. 398–421; Vera Ryan, Movers and Shapers: Irish Visual Art, 1940-2006 (2006), pp. 173–201.

1946 births
2020 deaths
Irish art historians
Museum people from Dublin (city)